Cesare Campioli (24 March 1902 – 25 January 1971) was an Italian politician and businessman.

He was member of the Italian Communist Party and was appointed Mayor of Reggio Emilia by the Prefect with a decree of 4 May 1945. He served as mayor for 17 years from 1945 to 1962.

Biography
Cesare Campioli was born in Cavazzoli, Italy in 1902 and died in Reggio Emilia in 1971 at the age of 68. He left the office of mayor in 1962.

See also
 List of mayors of Reggio Emilia

References

External links
 Cesare Campioli on istoreco.re.it.

1902 births
1971 deaths
20th-century Italian businesspeople
Italian Communist Party politicians
20th-century Italian politicians
Mayors of Reggio Emilia